Milhem Cortaz (born December 6, 1971) is a Brazilian actor.

Career

Cortaz' first role came on the 2000 film Mater Dei, written by Diogo Mainardi, where he portrayed a security guard. On 2002, he premiered on the television with a minor character on Rede Globo's unsuccessful telenovela Desejos de Mulher. On the following year, he started gaining some notoriety after starring on the critically acclaimed Hector Babenco film Carandiru, about the massacre on the prison of the same name.

On 2005, Cortaz starred on Rede Record's telenovela Essas Mulheres and acted on the controversial independent film A Concepção, in which he appears fully naked a considerable number of times. On the following year, he acted on Record's successful telenovela Cidadão Brasileiro and on the American-Brazilian film Journey to the End of the Night.

It was not until José Padilha's 2007 film Elite Squad, in which he portrays a corrupt police officer, that he gained notoriety of the major public. In 2009 he starred as Cazé on Record's Chamas da Vida and played the deceased father of former Brazilian president Luiz Inácio Lula da Silva in Fábio Barreto's Lula, o filho do Brasil.

Filmography

Film
2018 - Canastra Suja
2016 - Vidas Partidas
2016 - Malasartes e o Duelo com a Morte
2016 - Aurora
2016 - Altas Expectativas
2016 - Mundo Cão
2016 - Mais Forte que o Mundo
2016 - The Ten Commandments: The Movie
2015 - Sangue Azul
2014 - Trinta
2014 - Entreturnos 
2014 - Alemão 
2013 - O Lobo atrás da Porta
2012 - Boca as Osmar
2011 - Assalto ao Banco Central as Barão
2010 - Elite Squad: The Enemy Within as Fábio
2009 - Lula, o filho do Brasil as Aristides
2009 - Se Nada Mais Der Certo as Sibele
2008 - Dangkou as Not Dead
2008 - Nossa Vida Não Cabe Num Opala as Lupa
2008 - Encarnação do Demônio as Padre Eugênio
2008 - Road Movie
2007 - O Magnata as Lúcio Flávio
2007 - Nome Próprio as Locador
2007 - Elite Squad as Fábio
2007 - Não Por Acaso as Paiva
2007 - Querô as Sr. Edgar
2007 - Meu Mundo em Perigo as Fito
2006 - O Cheiro do Ralo as plumber
2006 - Journey to the End of the Night as Rodrigo
2005 - A Concepção as Lino
2005 - Cafundó as Plague trooper
2005 - De Glauber Para Jirges as Glauber
2004 - Cabra-Cega as the man who leads the break into the apartment
2004 - Nina as Carlão
2003 - Garrincha - Estrela Solitária
2003 - Carandiru as Peixeira
2003 - Garotas do ABC as Alemão
2000 - Através da Janela as Raí's friend
2000 - Mater Dei as security guard
1999 - Por Trás do Pano as Puck

Television
2018: O Sétimo Guardião as Delegate Joubert Machado
2018: Rua Augusta as Raul
2016: A Terra Prometida as Caleb
2015: Os Dez Mandamentos as Bomani, Caleb
2009: Poder Paralelo as Nina's husband
2008: Chamas da Vida as Cazé
2007: Bicho do Mato as Paulo
2007: Vidas Opostas as Sextavado
2006: Cidadão Brasileiro as Américo Pereira
2005: Essas Mulheres as Lobato
2004: A Diarista as Osvaldo (episode "Aquele do Supermercado")
2003: Carga Pesada (episode "Companheiros")
2002: Desejos de Mulher as Xavier

External links

1972 births
Living people
Male actors from São Paulo
Brazilian people of Arab descent
Brazilian people of Italian descent
Brazilian male film actors
Brazilian male television actors
20th-century Brazilian male actors
21st-century Brazilian male actors